This page tracks the progress of the Lithuania men's national basketball team participating in 2016 Summer Olympics.

Main roster 
On June 8, the twenty candidates list was published, who were invited to the training camp. The list surprisingly did not included last year European vice-champion Lukas Lekavičius. On July 16, the final Olympic roster was announced, however two of the last candidates: Artūras Milaknis and Vaidas Kariniauskas had to remain with the national team till the last friendly match in case if someone will get injured. Though, Milaknis left the team quickly. Following Ulanovas injury, Kariniauskas qualified into the final roster.

Candidates that did not make it to the final team

Depth chart

Preparation matches

2016 Summer Olympics

Group phase 
Lithuania was drawn into the Group B.

All times are local (UTC−3).

Quarter-final

References

Lithuania
2016
Olympics